The creaky-voiced glottal approximant is a consonant sound in some languages. It involves tension in the glottis and diminution of airflow, compared to surrounding vowels, but not full occlusion.

Features 
Features of the creaky-voiced glottal approximant

Its phonation is creaky-voiced

Occurrence
It is an intervocalic allophone of a glottal stop in many languages. It is reported to be contrastive only in Gimi  in which it is phonologically the voiced equivalent of the glottal stop .

See also
 Voiced glottal fricative

References

Glottal consonants
Approximant consonants
Pulmonic consonants
Voiced oral consonants